The men's tournament of water polo at the 2008 Summer Olympics at Beijing, People's Republic of China, began on 10 August and lasted until 24 August 2008. All games were held at the Ying Tung Natatorium.

Teams from twelve nations competed, seeded into two groups for the preliminary round. 44 games were played, 30 of them in the preliminary round (each team played the other teams in the group). Seven classification games and seven games in the medal round were also played.

Format
The format of water polo at the 2008 Summer Olympics:
Twelve teams are divided into two preliminary groups, composed of six teams each, and play a single round robin in each group.
The first placed team of each group will have a bye. The second and third placed teams will play against each other in a cross-group format. Losers go on to play a series of classification games.
The fifth and sixth placed teams from each group in the preliminary round play against each other in a cross-group format to determine who will play for places 9–12. These games make up part of the quarterfinal round. The fourth placed teams from each group have a bye in this round. The losers of the classification games in the quarterfinal round will play for places 11–12. The winners of the classification games in the quarterfinal round will play the fourth placed teams from each group to determine who will play for places 7–10. These games are part of the semifinal round. The losers of the classification 7–10 games will play each other for places 9–10. The winners will play for places 7–8.
Winners from the quarterfinal will progress to the semifinals and play against the first placed teams in each group of the preliminary round. Losers go on to play classification games.
Winners of the semifinals will contest the gold medal game and the losers the bronze medal game.

Preliminary round

Group A

All times are China Standard Time (UTC+8).

Group B

Classification round
Bracket

Classification 7th–12th

Classification 11th–12th

Classification 7th–10th

Classification 9th–10th

Classification 7th–8th

Medal round
Bracket

Quarterfinals

Classification 5th–6th

Semifinals

Bronze medal game

Gold medal game

Ranking and statistics

Final rankings

Multi-time Olympians

Five-time Olympian(s): 1 player
 : Tibor Benedek

Four-time Olympian(s): 10 players
 : Igor Hinić
 : Georgios Afroudakis
 : Tamás Kásás
 : Alberto Angelini, Fabio Bencivenga, Alessandro Calcaterra
 : Aleksandar Šapić, Dejan Savić, Vladimir Vujasinović
 : Ángel Andreo (GK)

Multiple medalists

Three-time Olympic medalist(s): 10 players
 : Tibor Benedek, Péter Biros, Tamás Kásás, Gergely Kiss, Tamás Molnár, Zoltán Szécsi (GK)
 : Aleksandar Ćirić, Aleksandar Šapić, Dejan Savić, Vladimir Vujasinović

Leading goalscorers

Source: Official Results Book (page 179)

Leading goalkeepers

Source: Official Results Book (page 175)

Leading sprinters

Source: Official Results Book (page 178)

Awards
Media All-Star Team
 Goalkeeper
  Merrill Moses (70 saves)
 Field players
  Tony Azevedo (17 goals, 2 sprints won)
  Péter Biros (13 goals, 3 sprints won)
  Alessandro Calcaterra (centre forward, 27 goals)
  Mlađan Janović (13 goals, 5 sprints won)
  Felipe Perrone (16 goals)
  Dániel Varga (8 goals)

See also
 Water polo at the 2008 Summer Olympics – Women's tournament

References

Sources
 PDF documents in the LA84 Foundation Digital Library:
 Official Results Book – 2008 Olympic Games – Water Polo (download, archive)
 Water polo on the Olympedia website
 Water polo at the 2008 Summer Olympics (men's tournament)
 Water polo on the Sports Reference website
 Water polo at the 2008 Summer Games (men's tournament) (archived)

External links
 Beijing 2008 Summer Olympics

O
Men's tournament
Men's events at the 2008 Summer Olympics